Blastobasis legrandi is a moth in the  family Blastobasidae. It was described by Adamski in 1995. It is found on the Seychelles.

References

Natural History Museum Lepidoptera generic names catalog

Blastobasis
Moths described in 1995